Formation dance is a style of ballroom dancing. It is pattern or shadow team dancing by couples in a formation team. The choreography may be based on a particular dance or a medley of dances. Formation dancing may be done for exhibition or for competition between teams. There is also a type of formation in Bhangra.

International style ballroom: dance sport

History
Formation dancing originated in 1932 in London's Astoria Ballroom. It was Olive Ripman who introduced it under the name "pattern dancing". Soon it became a competitive dance form.

Formation team contests began in the 1930s in England, and spread to many other countries. International matches have taken place. Formation dances were an important part of the BBC TV program Come Dancing when Frank and Peggy Spencer's formation teams competed against Constance Millington's team. The peak of popularity was in the 1960s, and is now growing from strength to strength with formation teams from all over the world competing against each other.

Choreography 

The choreography of a  formation team includes both choreography of a dancesport routine of an individual couple and the overall pattern of movements of the couples on the floor. All couples are expected to follow the beat of the music and movements should be executed simultaneously. Teams are marked on their synchronicity

Latin Dancesport formation is a medley of dances that include the 5 International Latin dances: Cha Cha, Rumba, Jive, Paso Doble and Samba.

Standard or Ballroom formation is a medley of the 5 international ballroom dances Waltz, Quickstep, Tango, Viennese Waltz and Foxtrot.

The routines generally feature at least some free-form choreography in the walk on and walk off, which may include movements from jazz dance, ballet, or any other type of dance.  This is clearly marked by a gong.
A complete routine usually lasts a total of 6 minutes.

Formation routines allow dancers to show off their own technique in addition to their ability to move as a team.
Unlike individual competitions tricks such as "round abouts", "chain reactions" form a large section of the choreography.

Shapes (also known as patterns or images) that are an accepted part of choreography are diamonds, squares, diagonals, circles and lines. The routine is judged by the distribution of competitors across the floor, how "readable" the patterns are and the transitions between these patterns.

Specialist formation choreographers include Ona Skaistutė Idzelevičienė, Roberto Albanese, Horst Beer,  and Rachael Holland.

Competitions 

The international governing body is the International DanceSport Federation (IDSF) (which has Olympic recognition). Competing teams must be a member of one of its member organisations such as the English amateur dancesport association ltd (EADA)

The following is a summary of the IDSF rules for European and World Formation competitions.
Each member country may send 2 formation teams to compete in each of the 2 international styles (Latin and Standard).
These are selected by national competitions, such as the British National Championships at the Blackpool Dance Festival.
International competitions have a minimum of 4 countries
The usual sporting anti-doping rules apply.
All competitors must be amateurs.
Each team must contain between 6 and 8 couples.
In the standard section Men's dress must be black or midnight blue.
In Latin men may wear coloured shirts but all men must dress the same.
In standard formation, solo work is restricted to 8 bars. This does not apply in Latin where solo work usually plays a part.
Lifts are not allowed in the main "judged" part of the routine, but are usually allowed in the walk on and walk off, which is clearly marked by a gong.
A routine is a maximum of 6 minutes long including entry to and from the floor (a walk on and walk off). Only  minutes of this is judged so a gong is used to clearly signify which sections are to be judged.
Competing teams are judged by those experienced in formation.

In early rounds, judges mark if they believe teams should go through to the next round. In final rounds teams are ranked and the skating system applies.

Other competitions of note are the Blackpool Dance Festival and the Donaupokal Invitational Competition Vienna.
Germany is notable in having several leagues of formation teams, and holds several competitions each year.

Formation teams, 2013
This is a list of Adult Formation Teams competing in 2013 in the IDSF World Ranking Competition.  There were 22 Latin Teams and 18 Standard teams that compete annually in the World Cup

Results 

Below are the Winners of IDSF World Championships

See also 
 List of DanceSport dances
 Swedish Dancesport Federation
 WDSF World Formation Latin Championships

References

External links 

current IDSF Latin Formation Results
XS Latin, Currently the Englands Top Latin Formation Team
TSG Bremerhaven Latin Formation Team Germany
International Governing body
Information about formation dancing in The Netherlands
Double V Netherlands
Formation Dance on YouTube
Examples of Historical Costumes
 Irish Ceili dances

Group dances
Competitive dance
Ballroom dance
Dancesport